Sédhiou Region is a region of Senegal located in the southwest of the country in the natural region called Casamance.

It was historically a department of the Kolda Region until 2008.

It is located between the Kolda Region in the east and the Ziguinchor Region in the west.

It also shares borders with the Gambia in the north and Guinea-Bissau in the south.

Departments
Sédhiou Region has three departments:
Bounkiling Département
Goudoump Département
Sédhiou Département

 
2008 establishments in Senegal
Regions of Senegal